Heinz Conrads (December 21, 1913 – April 9, 1986) was an Austrian actor, radio and television host, and Wienerlied performer. He appeared in more than thirty films during his career including the 1947 historical It's Only Love.

Selected filmography
 It's Only Love (1947)
 Spring on Ice (1951)
 Knall and Fall as Imposters  (1952)
 Adventure in Vienna (1952)
 To Be Without Worries (1953)
 Grandstand for General Staff (1953)
 Love, Summer and Music (1956)
 Castle in Tyrol (1957)
 Wiener Schnitzel (1967)

References

Bibliography 
 Fritsche, Maria. Homemade Men in Postwar Austrian Cinema: Nationhood, Genre and Masculinity. Berghahn Books, 2013.

External links 
 

1913 births
1986 deaths
Austrian male film actors
Male actors from Vienna
20th-century Austrian male actors
Mass media people from Vienna